Hugo Porta (born 11 September 1951) is a former Argentine Rugby Union footballer, an inductee of both the International Rugby Hall of Fame and IRB Hall of Fame, and one of the best fly-halves the sport has seen. During the 1970s and 1980s, he played 58 times for Los Pumas, captaining them on 34 occasions, including leading them during the first World Cup in 1987.

Porta made his international debut in 1971. His best performances came in the late 1970s and early 1980s, with 1977 draw with France, the Pumas' 1979 24–13 win against Australia, and a 21–21 tie with the All Blacks on 2 November 1985.

In December 2018, Porta was elected as president of Argentine sports club Banco Nación, where he spent his entire career as player.

Career

Porta was born in Buenos Aires. He played football (soccer) and almost signed for Boca Juniors but then changed to rugby union, joining Banco Nación. Porta made his debut for Argentina on 10 October 1971 against Chile in the starting line up. He earned another three caps that year in games against Brazil, Paraguay and Uruguay. The following year Argentina played two games against the South African Springboks in Buenos Aires.

Porta played seven times for the national team the following season, including matches against Romania as well as Ireland and Scotland XVs (non-cap). During the 1974 and 75 seasons, Argentina played four Tests against France. In 1976 games were also played against Welsh and New Zealand XVs (non-cap). Porta became the national captain in 1977, and in his first game in charge, led the Pumas against France. Argentina lost 3–26, with Porta getting Argentina's only points through a penalty goal. However, in the following match, the nations drew 18-all, Hugo providing all of Argentina's points through six penalties, as, for France, did Jean-Michel Aguirre, who also kicked six penalties.

Porta led Argentina in two matches during October 1978; against an England XV (non-cap) and Italy. The following season he led the Pumas against a New Zealand XV (non-cap) in a two match series. On 27 October 1979 Porta led Argentina to a victory over Australia in Buenos Aires, winning 24–13. Porta kicked two conversions, one penalty and three drop goals to contribute 18 points during the match. Although the following leg was lost 12–17, the win became a landmark for Argentina.

Porta captained the South American Jaguars on three tours of South Africa between 1980 and 1984. Following the 1980 South America tour, Porta led Argentina to two victories over Fiji, and drew with England in 1981. During the second South America tour in 1982 South America won the second of the two internationals in Bloemfontein, with Porta scoring all of the 21 points in the victory. Argentina also defeated Australia 18-3 in Brisbane at Ballymore in 1983. Another South American tour took place in 1984. Argentina also defeated France 24-16 in June 1985. Following a 20–33 loss to the All Blacks that October, the famous 21–21 draw happened on 2 November, with Porta kicking four penalties and three drop goals for 21 points. Porta is the only Argentine player to have represented the South African Barbarians Club.

Porta led Argentina to the 1987 World Cup, at the age of 36 and retired after the tournament. In their first pool match they lost to Fiji 28–9. The following game saw Argentina win, defeating Italy 25–16. They were defeated 46–15 by the All Blacks in the last game. He came out of retirement briefly in 1990 to play games against Ireland, England and Scotland. In 1991 he was appointed Argentine Ambassador to South Africa by President Carlos Menem, and in 1994 became Argentina's Minister for Sport. In 2000 his car was carjacked by thieves in Buenos Aires, but they returned his vehicle after reading whose car they had stolen in the newspapers.

In September 2007 Will Carling, the renowned English Rugby Union captain included Porta among his list of top ten rugby players af all time. Former Australian flyhalf Mark Ella wrote of Porta that, "I've never played against a better five-eighth."

Honours and awards

Club
Banco Nación
 Torneo de la URBA (2): 1986, 1989 
 Sevens championship (4): 1974, 1984, 1987, 1988

Individual Honors
Olimpia de Oro Award (for "sportsman of the year" in Argentina): 1985 
Olimpia de Plata Award (for "rugby union player of the year" in Argentina): 1975, 1977, 1978, 1980, 1982 
Midi Olimpique Magazine: "Best rugby union player of the world" (1985) 
Rothmans Yearbook Magazine: "Best Fly-half of the 1980s" (1989).
Member of the Rugby hall of fame of New Zealand.
All-time top scorer of Argentina primera división: 301 points 
All-time 2nd. scorer of Argentina national team: 590 points (1970–90) 
Enter to the Guinness World Records due to having scored seven penalties and a conversion in the same match (in 1982 versus the Springboks).

See also
 International Rugby Hall of Fame
 IRB Hall of Fame
 Argentina national rugby union team
 Argentine Rugby Union

References

External links

Sporting Heroes

1951 births
Living people
Rugby union players from Buenos Aires
Government ministers of Argentina
Ambassadors of Argentina to South Africa
Argentine rugby union players
Rugby union fly-halves
World Rugby Hall of Fame inductees
Argentina international rugby union players